Ira Rakatansky (October 3, 1919 – March 4, 2014) was a modernist architect from, and based in, Rhode Island.  He studied modern architecture under Walter Gropius and Marcel Breuer at the Harvard Graduate School of Design.

Life and work 
Ira Rakatansky was born in Rhode Island to Russian emigrants to America, Benjamin and Martha (Bornstein) Rakatansky.  In 1942 Rakatansky received a Diploma in Architecture from Rhode Island School of Design.  He entered the architecture school at Harvard in 1943.  In 1945 and 1946 he received his Bachelor of Architecture and his Master of Architecture degrees from the Harvard Graduate School of Design.  Rakatansky was awarded the Wheelwright Fellowship to work on his master's degree at Harvard.

In 1946 Rakatansky established an independent practice within the office of architect Samuel M. Morino.  In 1948 he established a collaborative practice with engineer Samuel Lerner before establishing his own practice in Providence, Rhode Island in 1949.

In 1965 he was president of AIA Rhode Island, a chapter of the American Institute of Architects.

Chronology of work 
Works built:
 1947, Halsband House, East Greenwich, Rhode Island
 1948, Medical Office Building, Providence, Rhode Island
 1948, Miller House, Providence, Rhode Island
 1948, Weinstein House, Providence, Rhode Island
 1949, Camp Walt Whitman Dining Hall, Pike, New Hampshire
 1949, Reversible Chair
 1949, Weisberg House, Newport, Rhode Island
 1950, Horn House, Rehoboth, Massachusetts
 1950, Wax House, Providence, Rhode Island
 1950, Feingold House, Providence, Rhode Island
 1950, Zitserman House, Providence, Rhode Island
 1951, Blanding House, Greene, Rhode Island
 1952, Osburne House, Hampton, Connecticut
 1953, Blanding's Pharmacy, Providence, Rhode Island
 1953, Pollock House, Attleboro, Massachusetts
 1954, Falk House, Narragansett, Rhode Island
 1954, Rakatansky House, Lincoln, Rhode Island
 1954, Spring Green Memorial Church, Warwick, Rhode Island
 1955, Dunn House, Lexington, Massachusetts
 1955, Franeck House, East Greenwich, Rhode Island
 1955, Rosen House, Pawtucket, Rhode Island
 1955, Starr House, Lexington, Massachusetts
 1955, Ziskind House, Middletown, Rhode Island
 1955, Renovations to Broad Street Synagogue, Providence, Rhode Island
 1956, Miller House, Providence, Rhode Island
 1957, Rogers House, Weekapaug, Rhode Island
 1957, Rogge House, Stamford, Connecticut
 1957, Shipyard Drive-in Theatre, Providence, Rhode Island
 1958, Blieden House, Warwick, Rhode Island
 1958, Levin House, Woonsocket, Rhode Island
 1958, Myers House and Office, Providence, Rhode Island
 1958, Rakatansky House, Providence, Rhode Island
 1958, Temple Beth Am, Warwick, Rhode Island
 1958, Ten Pin Lanes Bowling, Providence, Rhode Island
 1959, 15 Meeting Street, Providence, Rhode Island
 1959, Caldarone House, North Providence, Rhode Island
 1960, Atlantic Bowling, East Providence, Rhode Island
 1960, Baker House, Providence, Rhode Island
 1960, Greenwood Nurseries, Warwick, Rhode Island
 1960, Simon House, Providence, Rhode Island
 1961, Reck House, Acapesket, Massachusetts
 1962, Meadow-Glen Twin Drive-In, Medford, Massachusetts
 1962, Burnight House, Barrington, Rhode Island
 1963, Waring House, Virgin Islands
 1964, Church of God and Saints of Christ, Providence, Rhode Island
 1967, Teamster Administration Building, Providence, Rhode Island
 1968, Chisholm House, Barrington, Rhode Island
 1968, Gravdahl House, Jamestown, Rhode Island
 1968, Harper House, Little Compton, Rhode Island
 1969, Aber House, Tiverton, Rhode Island
 1969, General Wine Company Warehouse, Providence, Rhode Island
 1970, Collier House, Little Compton, Rhode Island
 1971, Bishop Plummer House, Suffolk, Virginia
 1971, Connecticut Laborers' Union, Hartford, Connecticut
 1971, Patterson House, Jamestown, Rhode Island
 1972, Connecticut Laborers' Union, West Haven, Connecticut
 1974, Glifford House, Matunuck, Rhode Island
 1975, Peterborough Convalescence Homes, Peterborough, New Hampshire
 1976, Persimmon Restaurant, Providence, Rhode Island
 1978, Arnold House, Tiverton, Rhode Island
 1979, Brown University Faculty Club addition, Providence, Rhode Island
 1980, Church of God and Saints of Christ, Suffolk, Virginia
 1980, Starr-Naylor House, Brookline, Massachusetts
 1981, Rakatansky Office Addition, Providence, Rhode Island
 1982, Bishop Plummer, Jr. House, Suffolk, Virginia
 1983, Saber House, Barrington, Rhode Island
 1984, New England Laborers' Training Academy (Dining Hall), Pomfret, Connecticut
 1985, Church of God and Saints of Christ (sanctuary addition), Suffolk, Virginia
 1985, New England Laborers' Training Academy (dormitory), Pomfret, Connecticut
 1986, Holocaust Memorial, Providence, Rhode Island
 1986, Slepkow House, Providence, Rhode Island
 1988, New England Laborers' Training Academy, Hopkinton, Massachusetts
 1992, Rosen House, Pawcatuck, Connecticut

References

Bibliography

External links 
 The Design Office - Ira Rakatansky project

1919 births
2014 deaths
20th-century American architects
Modernist architects
Modernist architects from the United States
Architects from Providence, Rhode Island
American people of Russian-Jewish descent
Jewish architects
Rhode Island School of Design alumni
Harvard Graduate School of Design alumni